Abd Allah ibn Muhammad ibn Maslama (c. 1004 – c. 1060), surnamed Ibn al-Aftas, was the founder of the Aftasid dynasty of the taifa of Badajoz, in what was then Al-Andalus. He was a miknasa berber from the Córdoba region. Ibn al-Aftas became the vizier of Sabur al-Khatib, a former slave of Caliph al-Hakam II, who became prince of the lower march of the former Caliphate of Cordoba. On the death of Sabur, Ibn al-Aftas seized power, and Badajoz under his leadership, became the capital of a principality centered on Guadiana and extending over central Portugal. He was a prominent military tactician and was surnamed "Al-Mansur" (the victorious). He died about 1060 AD.

References 

1000s births
1060 deaths
11th-century Berber people
Taifa of Badajoz